Douglas Arthur Hickox (10 January 1929 – 25 July 1988) was an English film and television director.

Biography
Hickox was born in London, where he was educated at Emanuel School. He started in the film industry at age 17, working at Pinewood Studios as "a thirty bob a week office boy".

Hickox worked extensively as an assistant director and second unit director throughout the 1950s and early 1960s. ‘’The British B Film’’ (Steve Chibnall & Brian McFarlane; BFI, 2009) credits him with working on over thirty musical shorts and a handful of jazz/pop supporting featurettes.  He worked on TV shows such as Sunday Break and Tempo and became a leading director of TV commercials. In 1966 he won several awards for his advertisements at the Venice International Advertising Film Congress.

He made his first major picture, Entertaining Mr Sloane, in 1970 at the age of 41. He joined forces with the producer who had the rights and raised the finance. Hickox was meant to follow it with A Mouthful of Gold with Nicol Williamson and The Italian Girl by Iris Murdoch but neither was made.

"I think of myself as an interpretive director," he said in 1970. "I'm a narrative director, basically. An audience should become totally involved in the film, the actors and the story. They shouldn't be aware of the director at all or of how things are done."

Over the next ten years, he developed a reputation for the wit and style of his direction, and for his taut action sequences. His work includes Les Bicyclettes de Belsize (1968), Entertaining Mr Sloane (1970), Sitting Target (1972), Theatre of Blood (1973), Brannigan (1975), Sky Riders (1976) and Zulu Dawn (1979). He worked on various TV movies and mini-series in the 1980s until his death. He died in a London hospital following a heart surgery operation at age 59.

Family
Hickox was married to Anne V. Coates, the Oscar-winning editor of Lawrence of Arabia. After his death, his second wife Annabel approached the Raindance Film Festival with an annual bequest from Douglas' estate. This bequest led directly to the creation of the British Independent Film Awards. In recognition of Douglas's commitment and support for new talent, BIFA inaugurated the Douglas Hickox Award, which is given to a British director on their debut feature.
 
Douglas had two sons, Anthony Hickox (b. 1959) also a director, and James D. R. Hickox (b. 1965) and two daughters, one with Coates, and one with second wife Annabel. Emma Hickox (b. 1964) is a successful film editor. Anthony Hickox is known for Hellraiser III: Hell on Earth (1992), whilst he was Executive Producer on Children of the Corn III: Urban Harvest (1995) directed by his brother James D. R. Hickox. Emma E. Hickox's resume includes The Brylcreem Boys, Kinky Boots, The Jacket, The Boat that Rocked, Blue Crush, Rock of Ages and A Walk to Remember.

Douglas Hickox was buried in Putney Vale Cemetery, London.

Filmography

As director 

Four Hits and a Mister (1962) (Short) 
It's All Over Town (1964) 
Just for You (1964) (re cut in US as Disk-O-Tek Holiday)
Les bicyclettes de Belsize (1968) (Short) 
 Entertaining Mr Sloane (1970) 
 Sitting Target (1972) 
 Theatre of Blood (1973) 
 Brannigan (1975) 
 Sky Riders (1976) 
The Philips Time Machine (1977) (documentary) 
 Zulu Dawn (1979) 
 The Phoenix (1982) (TV series) - 3 episodes
 The Hound of the Baskervilles (1983) (TV movie)
 The Master of Ballantrae (1984) (TV movie)
 Mistral's Daughter (1984) (Miniseries) - 2 episodes
 Blackout (1985) (TV movie)
 Sins (1986) (Miniseries) - 3 episodes
 I'll Take Manhattan (1987) (Miniseries) - 2 episodes
 Dirty Dozen: The Series (1988) (TV series) - 5 episodes

As assistant/second unit director 

Prelude to Fame (1950) - 3rd AD
Raiders in the Sky (1953) aka Appointment in London - 3rd AD
Both Sides of the Law (1953) aka Street Corner -3rd AD
Murder at 3am (1953) - 2nd AD
Black 13 (1953) - 2nd AD
The Master Plan (1954) - assistant director
Time Is My Enemy (1954) - assistant director
Adventure in the Hopfields (1954) - assistant director
Shadow of Fear (1955) aka Before I Wake - assistant director
Shadow of a Man (1955) - 1st AD
The Secret (1955) - assistant director
They Can't Hang Me (1955) - assistant director
ITV Play of the Week - "The Salt Land" (1955) - assistant director
ITV Play of the Week - "A Month in the Country" (1955) - assistant director
Theatre Royal (1955) (TV series) - assistant director, 2 episodes
It's a Great Day! (1955) - assistant director
The Secret Tent (1956) - assistant director
Strangers' Meeting (1957) - assistant director
The Spaniard's Curse (1958) - assistant director
The Haunted Strangler (1958) - assistant director
Fiend Without a Face (1958) - assistant director
Missiles from Hell (1958) aka Battle of the V1 - assistant director
Mingaloo (1958) (short) - assistant director
The Invisible Man (1959) (TV series) - 2nd unit director, 13 episodes
The House in Marsh Road (1960) aka Invisible Creature - 1st AD
The Snake Woman (1961) - assistant director
Double Bunk (1961) - assistant director
Murder She Said (1961) - assistant director

References

External links 

The Douglas Hickox Award

1929 births
1988 deaths
Film directors from London
People educated at Emanuel School